The Highest Law is a 1921 American silent historical drama film directed by Ralph Ince and starring Ince, Robert Agnew and Margaret Seddon.

Cast
 Ralph Ince as Abraham Lincoln
 Robert Agnew as Bobby Goodwin
 Margaret Seddon as Mrs. Goodwin
 Aleen Burr as The Girl
 Cecil Crawford as Tad

References

Bibliography
 Connelly, Robert B. The Silents: Silent Feature Films, 1910-36, Volume 40, Issue 2. December Press, 1998.
 Munden, Kenneth White. The American Film Institute Catalog of Motion Pictures Produced in the United States, Part 1. University of California Press, 1997.

External links
 

1921 films
1921 drama films
1920s historical drama films
1920s English-language films
American silent feature films
American historical drama films
American black-and-white films
Films directed by Ralph Ince
Selznick Pictures films
1920s American films
Silent American drama films